Klausdorf is a former municipality in the district of Plön, in Schleswig-Holstein, Germany. It is situated approximately 20 km northwest of Plön, and 5 km east of Kiel. On 1 March 2008, it was merged with Raisdorf to form the town Schwentinental.

Villages in Schleswig-Holstein